Hastings High School is a public secondary school in Hastings, Michigan, United States, serving students in grades 9–12. The school is part of the Hastings Area School System, which includes one junior high school and four elementary schools.

History
In 1877, the first graduating class of Hastings High School included only five students.

New building
From 1917 to 1970, Hastings High School students attended classes at 232 W Grand Street.  That address is now home to Hastings Middle School.  Students began attending classes in the new building at 520 W South Street on September 3, 1970.  "At the time of its opening, funds were approved to put all academic classrooms on a twenty-five to one pupil/teacher ratio," a major educational accomplishment achieved by few Michigan districts at that time.  The school contains one hundred thirty-two rooms including a gymnasium, library, cafeteria, and lecture hall.

Athletics
Hastings High School offers a number of extracurricular athletics, including:

Baseball
Basketball - boys/girls
Competitive cheer
Cross country - boys/girls
Football
Golf - boys/girls
Hockey
Sideline cheer
Soccer - boys/girls
Softball
Swimming - boys/girls
Tennis - boys/girls
Track - boys/girls
Volleyball
Wrestling

Notable alumni

Dann Howitt, Major League Baseball player for the Oakland Athletics, Seattle Mariners, and the Chicago White Sox.  Howitt was the last player to get a hit off of Hall of Fame pitcher Nolan Ryan - a grand slam home run.
Gladeon M. Barnes, U.S. Army major general who led efforts to develop the Sherman and Pershing tanks as well as ENIAC, the first electronic general-purpose computer.

References

External links
Hastings Area School System
Hastings High School

Educational institutions established in 1877
Public high schools in Michigan
Hastings, Michigan
Schools in Barry County, Michigan
Grand Rapids metropolitan area
1877 establishments in Michigan